Qin's wars of unification were a series of military campaigns launched in the late 3rd century BC by the Qin state against the other six major Chinese states — Han, Zhao, Yan, Wei, Chu and Qi.

Between 247 BC and 221 BC, Qin had emerged as one of the most powerful of the Seven Warring States in China.  In 230 BC, Ying Zheng, the King of Qin, unleashed the final campaigns of the Warring States period, setting out to conquer the remaining states one by one. Following the fall of Qi in 221 BC, China was unified under Qin control. Ying Zheng declared himself "Qin Shi Huang" (meaning "First Emperor of Qin") and established the Qin dynasty, becoming the first sovereign ruler of a unified China.

Background

Rise of Qin and early conquests 
Over the course of the Warring States period, the Qin state had evolved to become the most powerful of the seven major states in China, particularly after Shang Yang's reforms in the mid 4th century BC. The other six states would repeatedly adopt the policy of "vertical alliance" or hezong (合縱) in which they all joined in as allies against Qin. Qin state itself sometimes allied with other states in a "horizontal alliance" or lianheng (連橫), waging numerous wars against each other.

In 316 BC, Qin expanded south towards the Sichuan Basin by conquering the states of Ba and Shu. In 278 BC, the Qin general Bai Qi attacked Chu from the new conquered land in Sichuan. The Chu capitals of Ying and Chen (陳) were captured and Chu lands west to the Han River were lost. In 272 BC, Qin conquered the Xirong state of Yiqu. After the last horizontal alliance to punish Qi ended in 284 BC, Qin began to wage multiple wars against the northern Zhao state in 283, 269 and 265 BC.

In 269 BC, Fan Sui became chief advisor to Qin. He advocated authoritarian reforms, irrevocable expansion and an alliance with distant states to attack nearby states. In 265 BC, King Zhaoxiang of Qin made the first move by attacking the Shangdang region of Han state. The governor of Shangdang refused to surrender and presented it to the King of Zhao. The Qin and Zhao armies were locked in a 2-year siege at Changping, which culminated in a decisive defeat of Zhao by the Qin army. In 257 BC, the Qin army failed to besiege the Zhao capital Handan and was defeated by the allied force of Zhao, Wei and Chu.

At the time of King Nan of Zhou, the kings of Zhou dynasty had lost almost all political and military power, their remaining crown land was split into two states: West Zhou, centered in Wangcheng, and East Zhou, centered at Chengzhou. Qin forces conquered West Zhou in 256 BC, claiming the Nine Cauldrons and thereby symbolically becoming The Son of Heaven. In 249 BC, the new Qin king Zhuangxiang conquered East Zhou, putting to end the 800-year Zhou dynasty.

First Emperor Ying Zheng 
In 238 BC, Ying Zheng, the King of Qin, took over the reins of power after eliminating his political rivals Lü Buwei and Lao Ai. With help from Li Si, Wei Liao and others, Ying Zheng formulated a plan for conquering the other six major states and unifying China. The plan, which focused on annexing each state individually, was based on "allying with distant states and attacking nearby ones", one of the Thirty-Six Stratagems. Its key steps were to ally with Yan and Qi, deter Wei and Chu, and conquer Han and Zhao.

Unification

Conquest of Zhao

From 283 to 257 BC, Qin and Zhao fought in bloody wars. Zhao's defeat by Qin at Changping in 260 BC has severely weakened the latter state.

In 236 BC, while Zhao was attacking Yan, Qin used the opportunity to send two separate forces to invade Zhao. The Qin army led by Wang Jian conquered the Zhao territories of Eyu (present-day Heshun County, Shanxi) and Liaoyang (present-day Zuoquan County, Shanxi), while the other Qin army under the command of Huan Yi and Yang Duanhe captured Ye and Anyang. Zhao lost nine cities and its military prowess was weakened.

Two years later, Qin planned to attack Han but feared that Zhao might support Han, so the Qin general Huan Yi was ordered to lead an army to attack the Zhao territories of Pingyang (southeast of present-day Ci County, Hebei) and Wucheng (southwest of present-day Ci County, Hebei). More than 100,000 soldiers were killed in the battle. The Zhao army was defeated and its commander, Hu Zhe, was killed in action. In 233 BC, Huan Yi's army crossed Mount Taihang and conquered the Zhao territories of Chili and Yi'an, both located southeast of present-day Shijiazhuang, Hebei. Then, the Qin army under Huan Yi engaged the Zhao army commanded by General Li Mu at the Battle of Fei in which the Qin sustained a massive defeat and nearly lost all their forces.

In 232 BC, the Qin forces split into two groups to attack Fanwu (present-day Lingshou County, Hebei) and Langmeng (present-day Yangqu County, Shanxi), but were defeated again by the Zhao army led by Li Mu. However, the Zhao forces also sustained heavy losses and could only retreat to defend their capital, Handan.

In the following two years, Zhao was struck by two natural disasters — an earthquake and a severe famine. In 229 BC, Qin took advantage of the situation to launch a pincer attack from the north and south on Handan, the Zhao capital. Three Qin armies embarked from Shangdi (in present-day northern Shaanxi), Jingxing (present-day Jingxing County, Hebei) and Henei (present-day Xinxiang, Henan), respectively led by Wang Jian, Qiang Lei and Yang Duan He, to coordinate the attack on Handan. On the Zhao side, Li Mu and Sima Shang were put in command of the Zhao army. Li Mu ordered his troops to build defensive structures and avoid direct confrontation with the enemy. The Qin forces were unable to advance further and both sides reached a stalemate.

The Qin state bribed Guo Kai, a Zhao minister, to sow discord between King Qian of Zhao and Li Mu. The king doubted Li Mu's loyalty and ordered Li Mu to hand over his command of the Zhao army to his deputies, Zhao Cong and Yan Ju. When Li Mu defied the order, the king became more suspicious of him and ordered his men to take Li Mu by surprise and arrest him. Li Mu was executed in prison later on King Qian's order. In 228 BC, after learning that Li Mu had been replaced, the Qin forces attacked, defeated the Zhao army and conquered Dongyang (located east of the Taihang Mountains). Zhao Cong was killed in action while Yan Ju escaped after his defeat. Seven months later, Qin forces occupied Handan and captured King Qian, bringing an end to Zhao's existence.

Prince Jia, King Qian's brother, escaped from Handan and retreated to Dai (around present-day Yu County, Hebei). With help from some Zhao remnants, he declared himself the King of Dai. In 222 BC, Dai was conquered by the Qin army led by Wang Jian's son, Wang Ben. Prince Jia was taken captive.

Conquest of Han
Han was the weakest of the seven states and had previously been attacked several times by Qin. In 230 BC, the Qin army led by Neishi Teng moved south, crossed the Yellow River, and conquered Zheng (present-day Xinzheng, Henan), the capital of Han, within one year. King An of Han surrendered and Han came under Qin control. The territory of Han was reorganised to form the Qin Empire's Yingchuan Commandery, with the commandery capital at Yangdi (present-day Yuzhou, Henan).

Conquest of Yan
In 228 BC, after the fall of Zhao, Wang Jian led the Qin army stationed at Zhongshan (around present-day central Hebei) to prepare for an offensive on Yan. Ju Wu, a Yan minister, proposed to King Xi of Yan to form alliances with Dai, Qi and Chu, and make peace with the Xiongnu in the north, in order to counter the Qin invasion. However, Crown Prince Dan felt that the alliance strategy was unlikely to succeed, so he sent an assassin, Jing Ke, to assassinate Ying Zheng, the King of Qin. Jing Ke pretended to be an envoy from Yan to Qin and brought along with him a map of Dukang and the head of Fan Wuji, a Qin turncoat general. Jing Ke failed and died in his attempt to kill Ying Zheng.

In 226 BC, Ying Zheng used the assassination attempt as a casus belli to order Wang Jian and Meng Wu to lead the Qin army to attack Yan. The Qin forces defeated the Yan army and Yan's reinforcements from Dai in battle on the eastern bank of the Yi River (in present-day Yi County, Hebei) and pressed on to conquer Ji (present-day Beijing), the Yan capital. King Xi of Yan, Crown Prince Dan and the surviving Yan forces retreated to the Liaodong Peninsula. A Qin army led by Li Xin pursued the retreating Yan forces to the Yan River (present-day Hun River, Liaoning) and destroyed the bulk of the Yan army. Later, King Xi ordered Crown Prince Dan's execution and sent his son's head to Qin as an "apology" for the assassination attempt. Qin accepted the "apology" and did not attack Yan for the next three years.

In 222 BC, Qin forces led by Wang Ben and Li Xin invaded the Liaodong Peninsula and destroyed the remaining Yan forces and captured King Xi, bringing an end to Yan's existence. The former territories of Yan were partitioned and reorganised to form the Qin Empire's Yuyang, Beiping, Liaoxi and Liaodong commanderies.

Conquest of Wei
In 225 BC, a 600,000-strong Qin army led by Wang Ben conquered more than ten cities on the northern border of Chu as a precautionary move to guard the flank from Chu attacks while Qin was invading Wei. Wang Ben then led his forces north to attack and besiege Daliang (northwest of present-day Kaifeng, Henan), the Wei capital. As Daliang was situated at the concourse of the Sui and Ying rivers and the Hong Canal, its geographical location gave it a natural defensive advantage. Besides, the moat around Daliang was vast and all the city's five gates had drawbridges, making it even more difficult for Qin forces to breach the city walls. The Wei troops used the opportunity to strengthen their fortifications and defenses.

Wang Ben came up with the idea of directing the waters from the Yellow River and the Hong Canal to flood Daliang. His troops labored for three months to redirect the water flow while maintaining the siege on Daliang, and succeeded in their plan. Daliang was heavily flooded and over 100,000 people died, including civilians. King Jia of Wei surrendered and Wei came under Qin control. Qin established the commanderies of Dang and Sishui in the former Wei territories.

Conquest of Chu

In 226 BC, Qin forces led by Wang Ben attacked Chu and conquered 10 Chu cities. Two years later, Ying Zheng, the King of Qin, called for a meeting with his subjects to discuss the Qin invasion of Chu. Wang Jian felt that they needed at least 600,000 troops for the campaign, while Li Xin claimed that 200,000 men would suffice. Ying Zheng dismissed Wang Jian's idea and ordered Li Xin and Meng Tian to lead a 200,000 strong army to attack Chu. Wang Jian claimed that he was ill and retired to recuperate at home.

The Qin armies scored initial victories as Li Xin's army conquered Pingyu (north of present-day Pingyu County, Henan) while Meng Tian's captured Qinqiu (present-day Linquan County, Anhui). After conquering Yan (present-day Yanling County, Henan), Li Xin headed west to rendezvous with Meng Tian at Chengfu (east of present-day Baofeng County, Henan).

On the Chu side, the Chu general Xiang Yan had been avoiding using the bulk of the Chu army to resist the Qin invaders while waiting for an opportunity to launch a counterattack. During this time, Lord Changping, a Qin noble related to the Chu royal family, incited a rebellion in a city previously conquered by Li Xin. He also prepared for a surprise attack on Li Xin later. The Chu army led by Xiang Yan secretly followed Li Xin's army at high speed for three days and three nights before launching a surprise attack. Lord Changping's forces followed suit from behind and joined Xiang Yan's army in attacking Li Xin. Most of Li Xin's forces were destroyed in the battle.

Upon learning of Li Xin's defeat, Ying Zheng personally visited Wang Jian, who was in retirement, apologised for not heeding Wang Jian's advice earlier, and invited him back to serve in the army. He put Wang Jian in command of the 600,000 troops he had requested earlier, and assigned Meng Wu to serve as Wang Jian's deputy. Wang Jian knew that Ying Zheng did not fully trust him because he could easily turn against Qin with such a massive army under his command. Thus, in order to reduce the king's suspicions, he frequently sent messengers to maintain contact with the king, and request that the king reward his family after he had conquered Chu for Qin.

In 224 BC, Wang Jian's army passed through Chen (present-day Huaiyang County, Henan) and made camp at Pingyu (north of present-day Pingyu County, Henan). The Chu army led by Xiang Yan assaulted the Qin camp but failed to push back the Qin forces. When the Chu army tried to lure the Qin forces to attack them, Wang Jian ordered his troops to hold their positions and forbid them from attacking the enemy. After some time, Xiang Yan gave up and ordered the Chu army to retreat. Wang Jian then seized the opportunity to order his troops to launch an all-out offensive while the Chu army was retreating, taking them completely by surprise and routing the enemy. The Qin forces pursued the retreating Chu forces to Qinan (northwest of present-day Qichun County, Hubei) and defeated them. Xiang Yan was killed in action.

In 223 BC, Qin forces conquered Shouchun (present-day Shou County, Anhui), the Chu capital. Fuchu, the King of Chu, was captured and Chu was completely subjugated by Qin. The following year, Wang Jian and Meng Wu led the Qin army to attack the Wuyue region (covering present-day Zhejiang and Jiangsu), which was inhabited by the Baiyue, and captured the descendants of the royal family of the ancient Yue state. The conquered Wuyue territories became the Qin Empire's Kuaiji Commandery.

Conquest of Qi
In 264 BC, Tian Jian became the King of Qi. However, as he was too young to rule, his mother, the Queen Dowager, became his regent. The Qin state bribed Hou Sheng, the Qi chancellor, to dissuade the Qi state from helping the other states while they were being attacked by Qin. By 221 BC, Qi was the only state yet to be conquered by Qin. Even though its troops were not well-equipped and morale was low, Qi hurriedly mobilised them to the western border to guard against a Qin invasion.

In the same year, Ying Zheng used Qi's rejection of a meeting with a Qin envoy as an excuse to attack Qi. The Qin army led by Li Xin avoided direct confrontation with the Qi forces stationed on their western border, and advanced into the Qi heartland via a southern detour from the former Yan state. The Qin forces encountered little resistance as they passed through Qi territories and eventually showed up at the gates of Linzi (north of present-day Zibo, Shandong), the Qi capital. Caught off guard, Tian Jian heeded Hou Sheng's advice and surrendered to Qin without putting up a fight. The former territories of Qi were reorganised to form the Qin Empire's Qi and Langya commanderies.

Aftermath

In 221 BC, after the conquest of Qi, Ying Zheng declared himself "Qin Shi Huang" (literally "First Emperor of Qin") and established the Qin dynasty. The Qin Empire was divided into 36 commanderies, with Xianyang (present-day Xi'an, Shaanxi) as the imperial capital.

The emperor's expansionist ambitions did not end with the unification of China. In 215 BC, he ordered Meng Tian to lead more than 300,000 troops to march towards the eastern steppe and drive away the nomadic Xiongnu who had been encroaching the territory since during the Warring States period. Following a major victory against the Xiongnu, Qin forces reinforced and built a fortification, which became the Great Wall of China, stretching across the east from the Liaodong Peninsula towards the west of Lop Nur to prevent the nomadic tribes from returning again.

In the south, a Qin army comprising some 500,000 troops attacked the ancient Yue state and subjugated the Yue peoples who inhabited the areas around present-day Jiangsu, Zhejiang, Fujian and Guangdong. During the battle, another project was announced with the construction of a massive canal from the Qin imperial capital, Xianyang, towards the Yue state. It was a major key to victory for the Qin conquest of the southern kingdom, and the Yue state became a vassal of the Qin Empire for over a decade. After these two victorious battles, Qin Shi Huang was able to create a centralised empire that would become the bedrock of future Chinese dynasties. Although the Qin dynasty lasted only 15 years, its influence on Chinese history lasted for centuries to come.

In 209 BC, during the reign of the second Qin emperor, Chen Sheng and Wu Guang staged an uprising to overthrow the Qin dynasty due to the Qin government's brutal and oppressive policies. Although the revolt was crushed by Qin imperial forces, several other rebellions erupted throughout the Qin Empire over the next three years. The third and last Qin emperor, Ziying, surrendered to a rebel force led by Liu Bang in 206 BC, bringing an end to the Qin dynasty. Several of the rebel forces claimed to be restoring the former states conquered by Qin, and numerous pretenders to the thrones of the former states emerged. In 206 BC, the Qin imperial capital, Xianyang, was conquered and sacked by the forces of Xiang Yu, a descendant of the Chu general Xiang Yan. Xiang Yu and Liu Bang then got involved in a power struggle for control over China, historically known as the Chu–Han Contention. The power struggle concluded in 202 BC with victory for Liu Bang, who established the Han dynasty to replace the Qin dynasty.

Notes

References

Citations

Sources 

 .
 .
 Sima, Qian. Records of the Grand Historian.

Khan Academy

Military history of the Qin dynasty
China
Qin Shi Huang
Wars involving Imperial China